The anime series Gantz is an adaptation of the eponymous manga written and illustrated by Hiroya Oku. The series, produced by Gonzo and directed by Ichiro Itano, aired in Japan on Fuji Television and AT-X. Gantz tells the story of a teenager named Kei Kurono who dies in a train accident and becomes part of a semi-posthumous "game" in which he and several other recently deceased people are forced to hunt down and kill aliens hidden in Japan.

The song "Super Shooter" by Rip Slyme serves as the opening theme to every episode and the song "Last Kiss" by Bonnie Pink serves as the closing credits music. The Gantz anime is divided into two seasons: The first season is known as "The First Stage", while the second season is known as "The Second Stage", which is a direct continuation of the first season. The First Stage aired in Japan with several scenes censored due to inappropriate content such as violence and nudity. However, the DVDs from the series contained the scenes uncensored. The Second Stage aired on Japanese network AT-X on August 26, 2004. There are a total of 12 Japanese DVDs, released from August 28, 2004, to June 29, 2005. Additionally, the DVDs were compiled into box sets.

In 2004 ADV Films announced that they had licensed the Gantz anime series and would release it on DVD uncensored. The series was initially released in a 2-episode-per-disc format spanning 10 volumes, before later being released in various box set forms. On June 25, 2010, at the Funicon 4.0, Funimation announced that they had license rescued Gantz for release in the North American market in 2011.



Episode list

Season 1

Season 2

See also

List of Gantz chapters
List of Gantz characters

References

External links
 Funimation's official website where all episodes can be seen

Episodes
Gantz